Sinners are those who commit acts that violate known moral rules.

Sinners may also refer to:
 Sinners (1920 film), a lost 1920 silent American drama film
 Sinners (2004 film), an American romance film
 Sinners (2007 film), an American drama film
 Sinners (novel), the new title of Jackie Collins' 1971 novel Sunday Simmons & Charlie Brick
Sinners (EP), an EP by Lauren Aquilina

See also
 Sin (disambiguation)
 Sinful (disambiguation)
 Sinner (disambiguation)